Burrows and Badgers is an RPG style wargame produced by Osprey Games. Its characters are anthropomorphic animals.

Gameplay 
Burrows and Badgers is a skirmish style miniature wargame. Each character is played as an individual hero, meaning that no ranks of units or sorting is required. Instead of armies, each player has a group of such heroes, known as a warband. Players keep a log of the individual experience gained by all characters in their band.

Characters and Classes 
Players can have a variety of species fight in their warbands. The characters include rabbits, mice, badgers, snakes, shrews, and birds. The classes that characters can assume include wizards, barbarians and rogues.

Release 
Burrows and Badgers was released on April 17, 2018, by Osprey Games.

References 
3. https://boardgamegeek.com/boardgame/204680/burrows-and-badgers-skirmish-game-anthropomorphic
Wargames introduced in the 2010s